"Soon May the Wellerman Come", also known as "Wellerman" or "The Wellerman", is a sea ballad from New Zealand  first documented in the 1960s. The song refers to the "wellermen", pointing to supply ships owned by the Weller brothers, who were amongst the earliest European settlers of Otago.

In early 2021, a cover by British singer Nathan Evans became a viral hit on the social media site TikTok, leading to a "social media craze" around sea shanties and maritime songs.

Historical background

The history of whaling in New Zealand stretches from the late eighteenth century to 1965. In 1831, the British-born Weller brothers Edward, George and Joseph, who had immigrated to Sydney in 1829, founded a whaling station at Otakou near modern Dunedin in the South Island of New Zealand, seventeen years before Dunedin was established. Speaking at centennial celebrations in 1931, New Zealand's Governor General Lord Bledisloe recalled how the Weller brothers had on their voyage to New Zealand "brought in the 'Lucy Ann' (the Weller brothers' barque) a good deal of rum and a good deal of gunpowder...and some at least were rum characters". From 1833, the Weller brothers sold provisions to whalers in New Zealand from their base at Otakou, which they had named "Otago" in approximation of the local Māori pronunciation. Their employees became known as "wellermen". Unlike whaling in the Atlantic and northern Pacific, whalers in New Zealand practised shore-based whaling which required them to process the whale carcasses on land. The industry drew whalers to New Zealand from a diverse range of backgrounds encompassing not just the British Isles but also Indigenous peoples of the Americas, Pacific Islanders and Indigenous Australians. The whalers depended on good relations with the local Māori people and the whaling industry integrated Māori into the global economy and produced hundreds of intermarriages between whalers and local Māori, including Edward Weller himself, who was twice married to Māori women, thus linking the Wellers to one of the most prominent local Māori families, the Ellisons.

At its peak in 1834, the Otakou station was producing 310 tons of whale oil a year and became the centre of a network of seven stations that formed a highly profitable enterprise for the Wellers, employing as many as 85 people at Otago alone. From the Otakou base the Wellers branched out into industries as diverse as "timber, spars, flax, potatoes, dried fish, Māori artefacts, and even tattooed Māori heads which were in keen demand in Sydney". However, given that the Colony of New Zealand would not be declared until 1840, the Wellers were treated as foreign traders and were affected by protectionist British import tariffs on whale oil. The Weller brothers' success in the whaling industry was fleeting, and they were declared bankrupt in 1840 after failed attempts at large-scale land purchase in New South Wales. The Otakou station closed in 1841. In 1841, the Court of Claims in New South Wales ruled that the Weller brothers' purchases of land in New Zealand were legally invalid, after which the Wellers "slipped unobtrusively out of the pages of New Zealand history". Commercial whaling in New Zealand continued until the 1960s.

Synopsis

The song's lyrics describe a whaling ship called the Billy o' Tea and its hunt for a right whale. The song describes how the ship's crew hope for a "wellerman" to arrive and bring them supplies of luxuries. According to the song's listing on the website New Zealand Folk Song, "the workers at these bay-whaling stations (shore whalers) were not paid wages, they were paid in slops (ready made clothing), spirits and tobacco." The chorus continues with the crew singing of their confidence that the "tonguin'" will be the last step of their plight. Tonguing in this context refers to the practice of cutting strips of whale blubber to render into oil. Subsequent verses detail the captain's determination to bring in the whale in question, even as time passes and the quartet of whaling boats is lost in the fight. In the last verse, the narrator conveys how the Billy o' Tea is still considered locked in an ongoing struggle with the whale, with the wellerman making "his regular call" to strengthen the captain and crew.

History

New Zealand-based music teacher and folk music compiler Neil Colquhoun claimed to have collected the song around 1966 from one F. R. Woods. Woods, who was in his 80s at the time, had allegedly heard the song, as well as the song "John Smith A.B.", from his uncle. The song "John Smith A.B." was printed in a 1904 issue of The Bulletin, where it was attributed to one D.H. Rogers. David Hunter Rogers was a first-generation Scottish immigrant who worked in the Union Company beginning in 1880; Wellerman does not resemble "John Smith A.B." or his other published poems.  In 1973, "Soon May the Wellerman Come" was included in Colquhoun's book of New Zealand folk songs, New Zealand Folksongs: Songs of a Young Country.

Recordings
The song has been frequently performed and remixed, with over 10 recorded renditions between 1971 and 2005. In 1990, the New England-based folk trio of Gordon Bok, Ann Mayo Muir, and Ed Trickett recorded and released a version on their studio album And So Will We Yet, produced by Folk-Legacy Records of Sharon, Connecticut. In 2013, the Wellington Sea Shanty Society released a version of the song on their album Now That's What I Call Sea Shanties Vol. 1. A particularly well-known rendition of the song was made by the Bristol-based a cappella musical group the Longest Johns on their collection of nautical songs Between Wind and Water in 2018. In the wake of the "ShantyTok" social media sensation in 2021, Wellington Sea Shanty Society member Lake Davineer remarked that their recording had experienced a new burst of popularity. 
In 2021, two pirate metal bands covered "Wellerman"; Alestorm and Storm Seeker.

Popular culture adaptations and references

The Longest Johns version

The version of the song recorded by British folk group the Longest Johns (under the name "Wellerman") features as the third track on the group's second studio album, Between Wind and Water (2018). A remix of the song was released on January 12, 2021.

Nathan Evans version

A version by Scottish musician Nathan Evans further increased the song's exposure. Popularized as a sea shanty despite being more accurately described as a ballad, there was a surge in interest in sea shanties and a multitude of remixes and new versions. Evans's version has been praised for its "authentic sense of stoic forbearance" that has appealed to young people in lockdown during the COVID-19 pandemic, who like 19th-century whalers "are similarly marking time". In the Rolling Stone article discussing his success, Evans cited The Albany Shantymen version of the song as inspiration.  Because of its origins on TikTok, the trend of performing sea shanties like "Soon May the Wellerman Come" on social media has been called "ShantyTok". The song, jointly credited to Nathan Evans and remixers 220 Kid and Billen Ted by the Official Charts Company (OCC), reached number one on the UK Singles Chart. A new version of "Wellerman" with German folk band Santiano was released as a single on 19 February 2021. This version was included on the track listing of Santiano's EP Sea Shanties – Wellerman, which was released digitally on 26 February 2021.

In February 2021, Evans, 220 Kid, and Billen Ted performed the song for the CBBC television programme Blue Peter. In March 2021, Evans performed the song for the "End of the Show Show" segment on Ant & Dec's Saturday Night Takeaway Soon When the Saturday Come along with the programme's presenters. The performance included altered lyrics for the occasion and was accompanied by video footage of sing-alongs by celebrities, including Joan Collins, Josh Groban, Laura Whitmore and Dermot O'Leary. Crew members of the Royal National Lifeboat Institution, including those from Portishead and Sheringham, also submitted video for the performance, and Queen guitarist Brian May provided a guitar solo. In the seven countries where the remix has reached the top of the record charts, 200 non-fungible tokens were sold, which each include a new dance track, digital art, and a password redeemable for a future asset, with part of their proceeds going to the Royal National Lifeboat Institution and a scholarship by 220 Kid.

The version sparked multiple parodies, both on and off TikTok, including a Taylor Swift hit sung to the tune of Evans' version of "Wellerman"  performed by the United States Navy Band, a Roman Catholic priest who changed the shanty's lyrics to explain Ash Wednesday, and a parody called Waiting for the Vaccine by Rainer Hersch. 

In 2022, the Seattle Mariners used an upbeat electronic cover of Wellerman, with heavy accordion emphasis, as a rally song for attendees at T-Mobile Park.

Track listings

Personnel
Saltwives – producer, engineer, studio personnel
Alex Oriet 
David Phelan
Nathan Evans – associated performer, vocals
Samuel Brannan
Tom Hollings
William Graydon
Mike Hillier – mastering engineer, studio personnel
James Reynolds – mixer, studio personnel

Charts

Certifications

In April 2022, Evans helped publicise the Doctor Who story Legend of the Sea Devils with an adaptation of "Wellerman".

See also
List of number-one hits of 2021 (Austria)
List of Ultratop 50 number-one singles of 2021
List of number-one hits of 2021 (Germany)
List of number-one singles of the 2020s (Hungary)
List of top 10 singles in 2021 (Ireland)
List of Dutch Top 40 number-one singles of 2021
List of number-one songs in Norway
List of number-one hits of 2021 (Switzerland)
List of Official Audio Streaming Chart number ones of the 2020s
List of UK Dance Singles Chart number ones of 2021
List of UK Singles Chart number ones of the 2020s
List of UK Singles Downloads Chart number ones of the 2020s
List of UK top-ten singles in 2021
Lightning Tree song

References

External links
Notes and Lyrics to Soon May The Wellerman Come On New Zealand Folk Song.
Wellerman adapted to explain the Palestine situation. History of Palestine Shanty on the Independent May 2021.(video)

Songwriter unknown
Folk songs
Internet memes introduced in 2021
Memes
19th-century songs
Dutch Top 40 number-one singles
New Zealand songs
New Zealand culture
Number-one singles in Austria
Number-one singles in Germany
Number-one singles in Norway
Number-one singles in Switzerland
UK Singles Chart number-one singles
Ultratop 50 Singles (Flanders) number-one singles
Sea shanties
Maritime music
New Zealand folk songs
Otago Peninsula
History of Dunedin
Year of song unknown
Polydor Records singles
Whaling in New Zealand
Traditional music
2021 songs
2021 singles
Polydor Records albums
Polydor Records remix albums
Folklore
Ballads